Davita L. Watkins is an associate professor of chemistry at the University of Mississippi, where her research interest is in developing supramolecular synthesis methods to make new organic semiconducting materials for applications in optoelectronic devices, as well as studying their structural, optical, and electronic properties. Her group also investigates the design of dendrimer molecules for biomedical applications.

Education 
Watkins obtained a bachelor's degree in chemistry and anthropology from Vanderbilt University in 2006 and her Ph.D. from the University of Memphis in 2012. Her doctoral research under the supervision of Tomoko Fujiwara was focused on establishing new synthetic routes for a series of oligomers and studying their photochroic and solvatochromic properties.

Research and career 
Watkins began her postdoctoral research at the University of Florida in 2012, developing new organic materials for applications in photovoltaics. In particular, she worked on oligomers that could be synthesised via self-assembly techniques and studying their optoelectronic and redox properties.

She joined University of Mississippi in 2014 as an Assistant Professor, the first female tenure track professorin the department of chemistry and biochemistry. As of 2022, she is an Associate Professor. Her research in supramolecular chemistry specialises in designing new synthetic routes for making oligomer semiconductors for applications in optoelectronic devices by studying the relationships between their structural, optical and electronic properties. Her group is also interested in the synthesis of new dendrimer molecules for applications in drug delivery, theranostics, and biomedicine. The American Chemical Society highlighted her work with profiles and interviews.

Awards and honours 

 American Chemical Society Young Investigator Award, 2018
 NOBCChE Lloyd N Ferguson Young Scientist Award for Excellence in Research, 2018 
 Journal of Materials Chemistry C Emerging Investigator, 2018
 University of Mississippi Mike L. Edmons New Scholar Award 2018
 National Science Foundation CAREER Award, 2017
 Oak Ridge Associated Universities Ralph E. Powe Junior Faculty Enhancement Award, 2015

References

External links 

Living people
21st-century American chemists
American women chemists
Vanderbilt University alumni
University of Mississippi faculty
University of Memphis alumni
Year of birth missing (living people)
American women academics
21st-century American women